John MacDonald MacKenzie  (born 2 October 1943) is a British historian of imperialism who pioneered the study of popular and cultural imperialism, as well as aspects of environmental history. He has also written about Scottish migration and the development of museums around the world. He is Emeritus Professor of imperial history at Lancaster University and founder of the Manchester University Press ‘Studies in Imperialism’ series (1984).

Biography

He is the son of Alexander MacKenzie and Hannah (née Whitby) and was schooled in Glasgow (Scotland) and Ndola (Zambia), before graduating from the University of Glasgow and completing his Ph.D (1969) at the University of British Columbia in Vancouver and in  London. This cosmopolitan upbringing developed his interest in the history of the British Empire, a subject he has written about in Echoes of Empire and How Empire Shaped Us, and he has travelled extensively throughout its former territories. At Lancaster University he became the first Dean of Arts and Humanities. Among his non-academic posts and responsibilities, he was also chairman of governors of two schools in Morecambe, Lancashire, and was a magistrate of the Lancaster petty sessions (1990-2000). He retired from Lancaster University in 2002 and now lives in Perthshire, Scotland. Since retiring MacKenzie has worked on his website British Battles

Academic Career

At the beginning of his career he taught at the University of British Columbia, and subsequently at the University of Rhodesia (Zimbabwe), the University of Liverpool, and  Wilfrid Laurier University, Ontario. His principal post from 1968 was at the University of Lancaster, where he held the chair of imperial history from 1991 to 2002. He was also successively Principal of The County College, Dean of Arts and Humanities and Dean of Education. He holds (or has held) honorary professorships of the Universities of Aberdeen, St Andrews and Stirling and is an honorary professorial fellow of the University of Edinburgh. In 2016 he became Visiting Professor at the Centre for History, University of the Highlands and Islands.

His early work, the subject of his Ph.D, was on labour migration and pre-colonial technology and trade in Central Africa. He conducted oral research throughout Rhodesia (now Zimbabwe) in 1973-74 and this gave him a keen awareness of the traditional relationships between African communities and their environments. He was also influenced by his experiences as an archaeologist both in Scotland and in Africa, which served to emphasise his belief that historical evidence is to be found in sources other than documents.  This helped lead to his pioneering development of the study of the popular culture of imperialism in his books Propaganda and Empire (1984) and (edited) Imperialism and Popular Culture (1986), in which he argued that empire had just as significant effects upon the dominant as upon the subordinate societies. He used a wide range of materials from cultural sources, including ephemera. This proved to be controversial since some elements of the historical Establishment considered that British domestic history was somehow little connected with its empire.

In the Porter–MacKenzie debate his ideas were challenged by Bernard Porter in the latter’s The Absent-Minded Imperialists, although Porter never actually confronted MacKenzie's evidence head-on. However, MacKenzie’s followers have mounted a vigorous fight-back, not least in the many books in the Manchester University Press ‘Studies in Imperialism’ series dealing with the cultural history of empire, which he established and edited from 1984 to 2012. By 2022 it had reached a total of almost 180 titles making it the most successful academic series in British publishing. Its prime concern remains the conviction that imperialism as a cultural phenomenon had as significant an effect on the dominant as on the subordinate societies. Cross-disciplinary work has appeared across the full spectrum of cultural phenomena, examining aspects of sex and gender, law, science, the environment, language and literature, migration, patriotic societies and much else.

His next book, The Empire of Nature (1988), was an early contribution to the environmental history of empire, particularly charting the human relationship with animals, through both hunting and conservation, in the imperial take-over of Africa and India. His wider ideas on environmental history were set out in the Thomas Callander Memorial Lectures at the University of Aberdeen in 1995, and helped to open up a major field to which many other scholars have contributed.

He once again entered the realm of controversy with his critique of Edward Said's Orientalism, published in 1995, which was badly received by post-Saidians and post-colonialists, although many of his early publications pioneered their later work. Said's strict binarism and concentration on concepts of the 'other' were countered by MacKenzie's insistence that Orientalism could, in certain circumstances, involve constructive cross-cultural influences, notably in the arts. These notions were later accepted and developed by other scholars.  His interest in the visual arts was reflected in his chapter on the subject in the Cambridge Illustrated History of the British Empire (1996) as well as in Exhibiting the Empire (2015).

His 1991 professorial inaugural lecture ‘Scotland and the British Empire’ was well received and opened up new fields for him, including various aspects of work on the Scottish Diaspora.  This led to his book The Scots in South Africa (with Nigel R. Dalziel) of 2007 (while associated with to the Research Institute of Irish and Scottish Studies at Aberdeen University) and a number of edited works. These analysed notions of sub-British ethnicity and identity, not least in their associational, religious and cultural manifestations. He then developed the concept of the four nations and empire, extending the arguments of J.G.A. Pocock to the British Empire, suggesting that it was not so much ‘British’ as a combination of Irish, Scottish, Welsh and English empires, reflecting a range of ethnic skill sets, cultures and identities which in turn influenced British domestic history.

His lifelong interest in museums produced Museums and Empire (2009), a work resulting from a Leverhulme Trust Emeritus Fellowship which examined the dispersal of the idea of the museum in Canada, South Africa, Australia, New Zealand, India and elsewhere. This embedded the development of these institutions within the colonial bourgeois public spheres while reflecting contemporary interests in natural history and ethnography which in turn served to develop the individual identities of various colonies. In recent years he has become particularly interested in comparative empires and the manner in which such parallel studies can illuminate the history of the British Empire.

Andrew S. Thompson’s edited book Writing Imperial Histories  was published in 2013 celebrating the significance and influence of his ‘Studies in Imperialism’ series. The same year Karl S. Hele’s edited The Nature of Empires and the Empires of Nature, consciously echoing the title of his own earlier book of 1997, examined his environmental work while greatly extending it, notably in Canada.

In 2016 a festschrift conference was held in MacKenzie's honour at the Burn House in Angus, Scotland. The resulting book, The MacKenzie Moment and Imperial History edited by Stephanie Barczewski and Martin Farr, described itself as celebrating the career of 'eminent historian of the British Empire, John M. MacKenzie, who pioneered the examination of the impact of the Empire on metropolitan culture'. It was structured around the cultural impact of empire, ‘Four-Nations’ history, and the global and transnational perspectives, in essays demonstrating MacKenzie’s influence but also interrogating his legacy for the study of imperial history, not only for Britain and the nations of Britain but also in comparative and transnational context. The contributions from seventeen international scholars 'make crystal clear why the interpretational shifts initiated by MacKenzie’s work are of lasting importance’ (Martin Thomas, University of Exeter UK).

In 2020 MacKenzie published the first of two complementary synoptic works addressing cultural aspects of the British Empire. Pursuing his long-standing interest in the built environment, The British Empire Through Buildings sought to illuminate the history of the empire through the examination of its architecture and urban planning. It revealed the manner in which imperial rule was established and consolidated, and its globalising impact in both styles of architecture and urban development. It also illustrated the ways in which the economic ambitions of colonies together with the needs of British settlers and agents were met. 

This analysis illuminated the complexities of class and the racial dimensions of empire, and further insights were gleaned from the manner in which aspects of the built environment have been adopted and adapted for a post-colonial world. This was the first work to analyse such issues across the entire British Empire, in all its various types of colonies across five continents.

A second equally ambitious work emerged in 2022 with A Cultural History of the British Empire, a ground-breaking history and analysis of British imperial culture involving everything from sports such as horse-racing and cricket to art, statuary, theatre and ceremonial forms. As these were dispersed across the world through the agency of British representatives, emigrants and travellers, facilitated by the rapid growth of print, photography, film, and radio, imperialists imagined this new global culture would cement the unity of the empire. Instead, MacKenzie showed that this remarkably wide-ranging spread of ideas and influences had unintended and surprising results. Colonized peoples adapted elements to their own ends, subverting British expectations and eventually beating them at their own game. As indigenous communities integrated their own cultures with the British imports, with a profound influence on the global culture of the present day, the empire itself was increasingly undermined.

Editorial roles
He has also been an editor of major reference works, including Peoples, Nations and Cultures (2005) and the four-volume Encyclopaedia of Empire (2016), and has contributed many articles and reviews to journals as well as chapters in books. He was editor of the journal Environment and History, 2000-2005 and was editor-in-chief of Britain and the World, the Journal of the British Scholar Society 2015-20.

Media and other
He has given BBC Radio talks, has appeared on television programmes relating to the British Empire, and has written for The Scotsman and other newspapers. He was historical adviser for exhibitions at the National Portrait Gallery, London, and the Royal Scottish Academy, Edinburgh (both on David Livingstone, 1997) and the Victoria and Albert Museum, London ('Inventing New Britain: The Victorian Vision', 2001). He also contributed to the catalogue accompanying the exhibition 'Inspired by the East: how the Islamic world influenced Western art', held at the British Museum, London, in 2019.

Honours
He is a Fellow of the Royal Society of Edinburgh. In November 2021 he was awarded an Honorary Doctorate of Aix-Marseille University in France.

Bibliography

Books

Edited books

References

External links 
 John M. MacKenzie's website
 www.Manchesteruniversitypress.co.uk

 

Living people
Academics of Lancaster University
Principals of County College, Lancaster
Fellows of the Royal Society of Edinburgh
Fellows of the Royal Historical Society
Historians of the British Empire
1943 births
Environmental historians
Historians of Scotland
Scottish Africanists